General elections were held in Suriname on 19 November 1973. The result was a victory for the National Party Combination (an alliance of the National Party of Suriname, the Nationalist Republican Party, the  Party for National Unity and Solidarity and the Suriname Progressive People's Party), which won 22 of the 39 seats.

Results

References

Suriname
Elections in Suriname
1973 in Suriname
Suriname
Election and referendum articles with incomplete results